Images are artifacts that depict visual perception, such as photographs or other two-dimensional pictures.

Images may also refer to:

Music

Classical 
 Images (composition) (1901–1907), a cycle of six compositions for solo piano by Claude Debussy
 Images pour orchestre (1905–1912), an orchestral composition by Claude Debussy
 Images (Skempton) (1989), a set of piano pieces by Howard Skempton

Popular music 
 Images (band), a French synth-pop band
 Image song, a song related to a fictional work, sung in-character

Albums 
 Images (Sarah Vaughan album), 1954
 Images (Sonny Red album), 1962
 Images (The Walker Brothers album), 1967
 Images (Cilla Black album), 1971
 Images (Dan Hartman album), 1976
 Images (Lucio Battisti album), 1977
 Images (Brotherhood of Man album), 1977
 Images (Ronnie Milsap album), 1979
 Images (Amii Stewart album), 1981
 Images (Ralph Moore album), 1989
 Images (Reggie Workman album), 1990
 Images – The Best of Jean-Michel Jarre, 1991
 Images (Kenny Barron album), 2004
 Images (EP), 1993 extended-play disc by Dive

Other 
 The Images (Tasmania), a set of rocky islets off Tasmania
 Images (ballet), a 1992 ballet by Miriam Mahdaviani
 Images (film), a 1972 film directed by Robert Altman
 Images (book), a 1994 book by David Lynch

See also
 Image (disambiguation)
 Imagery